The albums discography of Brazilian singer-songwriter Ivete Sangalo consists of seven studio albums, three live album, seven compilation albums, one extended play and five video albums. In 1993, Sangalo began her career as lead singer of Banda Eva, the most successful Brazilian axé music band, and released six studio albums, one live album and two compilation albums.

In 1999 Sangalo began her solo career and release her self-titled album, with the smash hits "Se Eu Não Te Amasse Tanto Assim" and, "Canibal". Her second album, Beat Beleza, was released in September 2000 featuring the singles "Pererê" and "A Lua Que Eu Te Dei". In 2002 Sangalo released her most successful single, "Festa" from the same title album, Festa, and in 2003 was released Clube Carnavalesco Inocentes em Progresso, her least successful album. Her first live album, MTV Ao Vivo - Ivete Sangalo, was released in 2004 for the 10-year career commemorates at the Octavio Mangabeira Stadium, receiving more than 80.000 people featuring Gilberto Gil, the duo Sandy & Junior and the axé music singers Daniela Mercury and Margareth Menezes. The work sold around 1 million copies. In 2005 was released the five studio album As Super Novas featuring the smash hits "A Galera", "Abalou", "Quando a Chuva Passar" "Chorando Se Foi", the Kaoma's cover version.

In 2007 released their second live album, Multishow ao Vivo: Ivete no Maracanã, sold 700.000 copies and three Latin Grammy Award nominations in the categories Best Brazilian Song by "Berimbau Metalizado", Best Brazilian Contemporary Pop Music and Best Long Form Music Video. In 2008 Sangalo released the Children's music album Veveta e Saulinho - A Casa Amarela with the Brazilian axé music singer Saulo Fernandes, and in 2009 she released her seven studio album and three DVD Pode Entrar: Multishow Registro featuring the hits "Cadê Dalila", "Agora Eu Já Sei" and "Na Base do Beijo". In 2011 it is the turn of the singer's new show is released, Ivete Sangalo at Multishow ao Vivo: Ivete Sangalo no Madison Square Garden, recorded in New York City featuring Nelly Furtado, Juanes, Diego Torres and Seu Jorge.

Sangalo sold 17 million copies, making it one of the biggest record sales of Brazilian music industry. She's the artist with the greatest number of DVDs sold worldwide

Albums

Studio albums

Live albums

Compilation albums

Special albums

Singles

As featured artist

Promotional singles

Notes
A ^ Radio Kids-exclusive single.

Other appearances

Soundtrack appearances

Video albums

References

Discography
Discographies of Brazilian artists
Pop music discographies
Latin music discographies